David Wayne may refer to:

David Wayne (1914–1995), American actor
David Wayne (musician) (1958–2005), American singer

See also

David Wain (born 1969), American comedian and director